Manuel Huguet (28 November 1918 – 18 April 1995) was a French racing cyclist. He rode in the 1947 Tour de France.

References

External links

1918 births
1995 deaths
French male cyclists